Mutiara Thermal Power Plant (MTPP) is a 1200 MW(2×600 MW) coal based thermal plant located in the Tuticorin District of Tamil Nadu. It is  project of Coastal Energen Private Limited – a flagship power generation company of The Coal and Oil Group.

References

Coal-fired power stations in Tamil Nadu
Thoothukudi district
2014 establishments in Tamil Nadu
Energy infrastructure completed in 2014